Zdravko Zemunović (born 26 March 1954) is a former Serbian football player, manager and current head coach for Kamatamare Sanuki.

Playing career
Zemunović started his career at FK Teleoptik in 1969. After playing for Teleoptik for 7 years, he enjoyed playing for FK Čukarički, FK BSK Batajnica. In 1986, he retired due to knee injury at age 32.

After retirement
After his retirement, Zemunović enrolled in the department of Physical Education at University of Belgrade and acquired professional coaching license there.

Coaching career in Yugoslavia
As professional coach, Zemunović worked for the three professional football clubs in Yugoslavia (BSK Batajnica, Teleoptik, Voždovac) and won league championships in all clubs. He visited Japan as a member of Partizan for Kirin Cup in 1992.

Coaching career in Japan
In order to avoid the civil war of Yugoslavia, Zemunović and his family decided to move to Japan and he started his coaching career in Japan as a coach of Tosu Futures for a year. After working for a couple of amateur clubs in Chiba, Japan, He became the general manager of the youth and junior youth team of Shimizu S-Pulse in 1999 and cultivated young talents such as Takuma Edamura and Kota Sugiyama. In December 2000, he took up the post of the manager of Shimizu S-Pulse as the successor of Steve Perryman and won the Emperor's Cup on 1 January 2001 and also won the Japanese Super Cup next month.

After the coaching career in Shimizu S-Pulse, though he coached FK Rad for one season, he is engaging into the development of young talents as technical director.

Managerial statistics

Honours
Shimizu S-Pulse
Emperor's Cup:2001, 2000 (Runner-up)
Japanese Super Cup:2001, 2002
Asian Cup Winners' Cup:2001 (3rd place)
AFC Champions League:2002 (Final Round)

References

External links

1954 births
Living people
Serbian footballers
FK Teleoptik players
FK Čukarički players
FK Rad managers
Expatriate football managers in Japan
J1 League managers
J3 League managers
Shimizu S-Pulse managers
FC Gifu managers
Kamatamare Sanuki managers
Association footballers not categorized by position
Serbian football managers